David Gerald Unsworth (born 16 October 1973) is an English football coach and former professional footballer who is currently the manager of Oldham Athletic. Prior to this, he was most recently academy director and under-23's head coach at Premier League side Everton.

As a player, Unsworth played as a centre-back or left-back from 1991 until 2009. Unsworth is best remembered for his time at Everton during the 1990s, where he was part of their FA Cup-winning team of 1995 and acquired the nickname "Rhino". He earned one full England cap in 1995. He also played in the Premier League for West Ham United, Portsmouth, Sheffield United and Wigan Athletic, and in the Football League for Ipswich Town, Burnley and Huddersfield Town.

After retiring, he moved into coaching with Preston North End where he was twice appointed caretaker manager. He returned to Everton in September 2013 as assistant to Everton U21s head coach Alan Stubbs, and succeeded him in 2014. He was twice named caretaker manager of the club in 2016 and 2017.

Club career
Born in Chorley, Lancashire, Unsworth began his career in the youth system at Everton. He made his first team debut in an away game at Tottenham Hotspur in April 1992. He made few appearances for the senior side until the appointment of Joe Royle as manager. Royle made Unsworth a regular member of the starting XI, and he was part of the 1995 FA Cup winning team. After 133 league and cup games over several impressive seasons at Everton, Unsworth transferred to West Ham United for the 1997–98 season. He made his West Ham debut on 23 August 1997 against his old club, Everton. After receiving an ovation from Everton fans, Unsworth was on the losing side as West Ham lost 2–1. After his family failed to settle in London and only one season and 41 games he asked for a move closer to his Merseyside home. Rather than moving back to Merseyside, he was signed by Birmingham-based club Aston Villa for £3 million but his family did not settle in Birmingham. After only a month, before the season had even begun, citing problems with the lengthy commute from his home, he returned to Everton who paid Villa the same £3 million West Ham had accepted only a few weeks before.

Unsworth was a consistent performer in his second spell with Everton, being first choice left-back, but also scoring some vital goals in his role as dead-ball specialist, mostly penalties. At the end of the 2003–04 season, after a further 216 games and his contract expired, a disagreement with the club over the length of a new contract led to Unsworth leaving on a free transfer.

On 12 July 2004, he was signed by Portsmouth for the 2004–05 season on a free transfer. He made his debut in a 1–1 home draw with Birmingham City, scoring the equaliser from a penalty. He also scored another spot-kick in Portsmouth's famous 2–0 victory over Manchester United in October 2004. However, following the resignation of manager Harry Redknapp, Unsworth lost his place having played just 18 games, and spent the second half of the season on loan at Ipswich Town, making 16 appearances, scoring on his debut against Sheffield United.

On 22 August 2005, Unsworth was signed by Sheffield United on a three-year contract, on a free transfer after it became clear that Ipswich Town could not afford his wages. He was part of the team which were promoted to the Premier League as Championship runners-up at the end of the season. He missed a penalty for United in a 0–0 draw against Blackburn Rovers on 9 September 2006. Unsworth fell out of favour at Sheffield United under the management of Neil Warnock, and was placed on the transfer list in the January window.

On 5 January 2007, Unsworth signed for Wigan Athletic from Sheffield United on a free transfer. He played his first match on 13 January against Chelsea. On the last day of the 2006–07 Premier League season, in a twist of fate, Unsworth would score the penalty that sent down his former club Sheffield United, whilst simultaneously saving his new employers Wigan Athletic from relegation. Unsworth was released by Wigan at the end of the 2006–07 season on 17 May 2007.

On 11 August, he signed for Burnley on a one-year contract, scoring his first goal against Leicester City. At the end of the season, he was offered a new deal as a player-coach by manager Owen Coyle, but he rejected the offer and left the club on 30 June 2008.

On 8 August 2008, Unsworth joined Huddersfield Town on a one-year deal after impressing on trial in their pre-season. He along with five other players made his debut in a 1–1 draw against Stockport County at the Galpharm Stadium on 9 August 2008. Unsworth missed a penalty in a 2–1 defeat away at Millwall on 30 August 2008 and did not feature again. He was released from his contract on 30 March 2009 after making four appearances, and announced his retirement from football shortly afterwards.

International career
Unsworth was part of England's U20 squad that finished third at the 1993 FIFA World Youth Championship in Australia, scoring the first goal in their 2–1 third-place play-off win over Australia at the Sydney Football Stadium. He played for the England under-21 team on 7 occasions between 1994 and 1995. He made a single appearance for England's senior team, in a 2–1 victory against Japan at Wembley on 3 June 1995.

Coaching career
Unsworth announced his retirement on 3 April 2009. After retiring, he joined Preston North End as development coach. He was promoted to first team coach following the departure of Alan Irvine, and appointed caretaker manager on 30 December 2010 following the departure of Darren Ferguson, until the arrival of Phil Brown on 6 January 2011. On the dismissal of Brown and his assistant Brian Horton, Unsworth was appointed caretaker manager in December 2011 with Graham Alexander. On the appointment of new manager Graham Westley, Unsworth was dismissed.

He turned down the chance to manage Irish club Sligo Rovers in 2012. On 6 December 2012, Unsworth returned to former club Sheffield United as Head of Academy Coaching. Following the departure of Blades manager Danny Wilson in April 2013, Unsworth was named as assistant to caretaker-manager Chris Morgan at United. The following summer, and having reverted to his previous role following the arrival of David Weir as club manager, Unsworth was given permission to speak with Kilmarnock about their vacant managerial position. However, Unsworth rejected the approach, only to subsequently leave the Blades on 1 August 2013.

Since departing Sheffield United, he had been working alongside the Scottish FA as a course tutor and within the Everton academy system. In September 2013, he was appointed as assistant manager of the Everton U21 team, working with Alan Stubbs. In 2014,  Stubbs moved to Hibernian, leaving Unsworth in charge. In May 2016, following the departure of Roberto Martínez as Everton manager, Unsworth took charge of the final game of the 2015–16 Premier League,  a 3–0 win over Norwich City, alongside Joe Royle in a caretaker capacity. He returned to coaching Everton's Under-23 team following the appointment of Ronald Koeman as first team manager. After Koeman was sacked on 23 October 2017, Unsworth again became caretaker manager of the senior side. On 12 April 2022, Unsworth left Everton in order to pursue his ambition of becoming a first-team manager.

On 20 September 2022, Unsworth was appointed manager of National League club Oldham Athletic. He lost his first game in charge, a 3–0 defeat at Bromley.

Career statistics

Player

Manager

Honours
Everton
FA Cup: 1995
FA Charity Shield: 1995

Sheffield United
Football League Championship runners-up: 2006

References

External links

1973 births
Living people
Sportspeople from Chorley
English footballers
England international footballers
England under-21 international footballers
Association football central defenders
Association football fullbacks
Aston Villa F.C. players
Everton F.C. players
Ipswich Town F.C. players
Portsmouth F.C. players
Sheffield United F.C. players
Wigan Athletic F.C. players
West Ham United F.C. players
Burnley F.C. players
Huddersfield Town A.F.C. players
Premier League players
English Football League players
England youth international footballers
Preston North End F.C. managers
English Football League managers
Sheffield United F.C. non-playing staff
Everton F.C. managers
Premier League managers
English football managers
Everton F.C. non-playing staff
Oldham Athletic A.F.C. managers
Association football coaches
FA Cup Final players